Ivanovski (feminine: Ivanovska) is a common Macedonian surname that means 'son of Ivan'. Notable people with the surname include:

Filip Ivanovski (born 1985), Macedonian footballer
Katarina Ivanovska (born 1988), Macedonian model and actress
Mirko Ivanovski (born 1989), Macedonian footballer playing for Hajduk Split
Viacheslav Ivanovski (born 1975), Israeli Olympic weightlifter
Kalin Ivanovski (born 2004), Macedonian tennis player

See also
Ivanov (disambiguation)
Ivan (disambiguation)
Ivanovsky (disambiguation)
Ivanović (disambiguation)

Macedonian-language surnames
Patronymic surnames
he:איוואנוב